Shangshuijing station, is a station of Shenzhen Metro Line 5. It opened on 22 June 2011. It is located at a hillside west to Jihua Road, Buji Sub-district, Longgang District, Shenzhen, China.

Station layout

Exits

References

External links
 Shenzhen Metro Shangshuijing Station (Chinese)
 Shenzhen Metro Shangshuijing Station (English)

Railway stations in Guangdong
Shenzhen Metro stations
Longgang District, Shenzhen
Railway stations in China opened in 2011